Hot Potato may refer to:
Hot potato (game), a party game involving tossing a small object 
Hot Potato (video game), a 2001 Game Boy Advance video game

Computing
Hot potato routing, a networking strategy
Hot Potatoes, a software suite

Film and television
Hot Potato (1976 film), a 1976 American action movie
Hot Potato (1979 film), a 1979 Italian comedy movie
Hot Potato (game show), a 1984 American TV show
The Hot Potato, a 2011 British crime thriller movie

Music
Live Hot Potatoes!, by The Wiggles
 Hot Potatoes: The Best of Devo, by Devo
"Hot Potato" (song), by La Toya Jackson
"Hot Potato", by The Wiggles

See also
Baked potatoes